Russula subtilis is a basidiomycete mushroom of the genus Russula native to North America. Its flesh smells of parsley.

See also
 List of Russula species

References

External links

subtilis
Fungi described in 1924
Fungi of North America